The Treaty of The Hague (1625), also known as the Treaty of Den Haag, was signed on 9 December 1625 between England, the Dutch Republic and Denmark-Norway. 

Under the treaty, the English and Dutch provided Christian IV of Denmark-Norway with financial support for Danish intervention in the  Thirty Years War. Intended as the basis of an international coalition against Emperor Ferdinand II, additional parties were invited to join, including France, Sweden, the Republic of Venice, Savoy and any other members of the Holy Roman Empire, although they failed to do so.

See also
List of treaties
Thirty Years' War

References

Sources

External links
Text of the Treaty 
Timeline: 1625-1649
December 9 in History

Den Haag (1625)
1625 treaties
Den Haag (1625)
1625 in the Dutch Republic
1625 in England
17th century in The Hague
Dutch Republic–England relations
Bilateral treaties of the Netherlands